Rosdilah Siti Nurrohmah (born 3 October 1999) is an Indonesian footballer who plays as a defender for Asprov Jabar and the Indonesia women's national team.

Club career
Siti has played for Asprov Jabar in Indonesia.

International career 
Siti represented Indonesia at the 2022 AFC Women's Asian Cup.

References

External links

1999 births
Living people
Sportspeople from Bandung
Indonesian women's footballers
Women's association football defenders
Indonesia women's international footballers